Shyam Lal Bansiwal is an Indian politician.  He was elected to the Lok Sabha, the lower house of the Parliament of India from Tonk, Rajasthan as a member of the Bharatiya Janata Party.

References

External links
 Official biographical sketch in Parliament of India website

India MPs 1996–1997
India MPs 1999–2004
Lok Sabha members from Rajasthan
Indian National Congress politicians
1947 births
2001 deaths